Mykola Solskyi (born 22 May 1979) is a Ukrainian statesman, politician and jurist. On 24 March 2022, he was appointed as the Minister of Agrarian Policy and Food of Ukraine. Solskyi was elected to the Verkhovna Rada in 2019.

Biography 

In 2000, he graduated from the Faculty of Law of the University of Lviv, majoring in “Jurisprudence”, where he qualified as a lawyer. Since 2007 he is co-founder of Ukrainian Agrarian Holding.

On July 21, 2019, he was elected a People's Deputy of Ukraine.

On August 29, 2019, he was elected Chairman of the Committee of the Verkhovna Rada of Ukraine on Agrarian and Land Policy in the 9th Ukrainian Verkhovna Rada.

On March 24, 2022, Mykola Solskyi was appointed as the Minister of Agrarian Policy and Food of Ukraine.

See also 
 Shmyhal Government

References

External links 

 Ministry of Agrarian Policy and Food (in Ukrainian)

1979 births
Living people
University of Lviv alumni
Agriculture ministers of Ukraine
Ukrainian food industry businesspeople
Ukrainian jurists
21st-century Ukrainian politicians